Pearl Lam is a Hong Kong-born international gallerist. She is the owner of Pearl Lam Galleries.

Life and career
Lam was born in Hong Kong, which was then a British mandate. Lam is the daughter of Lim Por-yen, a Hong Kong real-estate tycoon and founder of the Lai Sun Group. At the age of eleven she was sent to be educated in the United States and the United Kingdom, where she studied accountancy and law. Following her graduation she returned to Shanghai to help her family oversee a real estate project. Not wanting to follow her parents footsteps, and with the help of artist Sun Liang, Lam soon became involved in the Chinese contemporary art scene.

In 1993, Lam started organising pop-up exhibitions in Hong Kong.

In 2004, Lam was asked by the French Cultural Attache to organise and curate a major exhibition in Shanghai as part of a year of cultural exchanges. The exhibition was called ‘Awakening: La France Mandarin’ and travelled to Beijing, Hong Kong and Paris that year. Lam was called the Chinese design ambassador to France by the French Foreign Ministry and Culture Ministry. From 2000 to 2008, Lam authored the column, "The Rave", for Baccarat Magazine (then known as 'Talkies').

In 2005 Lam opened her first permanent gallery space in Shanghai, in the early years of its rise as a centre of contemporary art. Focusing on design, Lam used the gallery to introduce Chinese collectors to the international art market. Her exhibition for French designer Andree Putman in Shanghai was also shown in Hong Kong's Design Centre. The same year, Lam participated in the Forum Talks at the Foire de Paris Foire Internationale d'Art Contemporain, and at a conference for the French Senate on Luxury as a guest speaker.

In 2006, Lam opened a new gallery on Middle Jiangxi Road in Shanghai where it remains today. In 2009, the design gallery was moved to the lower ground floor of the Middle Jiangxi Road gallery. In 2012, she opened a permanent branch of Pearl Lam Galleries in Hong Kong's Pedder Building. The gallery's debut exhibition was curated by Gao Minglu. It was named the best gallery show of the year. The gallery then changed its name from Contrasts Gallery to Pearl Lam Galleries.

In 2008, Lam founded the China Art Foundation. The foundation aims to foster global interest in contemporary Chinese art.

In early 2014, Lam opened a Singapore branch of Pearl Lam Galleries in Gillman Barracks. To inaugurate the new outpost, Lam hosted a group show curated by the author and broadcaster Philip Dodd. Her works extends to sponsoring exhibitions of western art in China and funding an artist-in-residence programme in Shanghai for Western and Asian designers.

In 2015, a second gallery space in the Sheung Wan district of Hong Kong, was opened with a focus on nurturing younger talents. The inaugural exhibition featured beeswax sculptures by the Beijing-based artist Ren Ri. The exhibit highlights Lam's support for young Chinese artists. Born in 1984, Ren creates beeswax sculptures by removing the artist's subjectivity and allowing bees, nature, and chance to take over the creation process.

Recognition
 2008:  One of 100 Women of the Year in 2008 by Corriere della Sera
 2012: One of the "2012 Art Power 100" by L'Officiel Art
 2012: "Design Power" list by Art+Auction
 2013: One of the most powerful women "Asia's Women in the Mix" by Forbes magazine
 2014: One of the top twenty-five women in the art world by artnet news
 2016: "The 2016 Power List: High-Wattage Women of the Art World" by Blouin Art Info

References

External links
Pearl Lam Gallery

Living people
1970 births
Chinese art dealers
Women art dealers
Chinese art collectors
Hong Kong women in business
Hong Kong people